Perumal (the 'Great One') is a medieval Indian royal title.

Perumal may also refer to:

 Perumal (deity), a Hindu deity 
 Perumal (film), a 2009 Tamil action film

See also 

 Legend of Cheraman Perumals
 Chera Perumals of Makotai, a ruling dynasty in present-day Kerala